Margaret Lally "Ma" Murray, OC (1888 – September 25, 1982, age 94) was an American-Canadian newspaper editor, publisher, and columnist, an officer of the Order of Canada, and the wife of publisher and British Columbia MLA George Murray.  The Murray's publications were The Chinook in Vancouver, British Columbia, Canada, the Bridge River-Lillooet News in Lillooet and the Alaska Highway News in Fort St. John.

A Kansas farm girl made good and known for her spicy wit, backcountry wisdom, and down-to-earth style, "Ma" was co-founder and editor (with her husband George) of the Bridge River-Lillooet News, the Alaska Highway News and other publications.  Her editorials were famously signed off with the catchphrase "And that's fer damshur!".

Early years
Born Margaret Theresa Lally in Kansas City, Missouri to Irish immigrants, Margaret was raised on rural Kansas farmland in the United States, largely in poverty. She was the 7th of nine children. She left school at 13. At 17, she spent a year in Fremont, Nebraska, studying to be a typist, bookkeeper, filing clerk, shorthand writer, and business administrator. She worked for a period in the shipping department at the Shipley Saddlery Company in Kansas City. She came to Vancouver, British Columbia en route to Calgary, Alberta, where she hoped to find herself a cowboy to wed (she and her sister, Bess, had corresponded with cowboys who had written in response to the notes they had tucked into the most expensive saddles being shipped north).

"Ye Ed" and her publisher-husband
In Vancouver, she found work as a secretary and bookkeeper for The Chanook, which was published by George Murray. Soon after she married him, in spite of their religious differences (she was an ardent Catholic—and madly in love with George—her entire life). She won continent-wide fame for some of her columns - either because she had a point, or because they were downright funny, and often coarse - or at least matter-of-fact.  The Murrays also launched various lesser known publications including Country Life In British Columbia, a popular magazine for rural women, and The Chinook, which was George's first venture upon his coming to BC from Ottawa, where he had worked as junior columnist for the Ottawa Citizen and apprenticed in politics under Sir Wilfrid Laurier.

Politics
Both had a high profile in provincial politics.  George, already a bright, articulate and somewhat visionary star in the BC Liberal Party, was a popular MLA from his arrival in Lillooet until his electoral demise in 1941.  Both Murrays had taken a strong stand in print in favour of the miners striking in the Bridge River, and alienated not only prime advertisers but also some of George's political backers; and by the time of the election most of the striking men had gone away to war; merchants without them as customers were also unwilling to support the Murrays.  George was squeezed out of office in 1945 in a narrow race with his old rival Ernest Crawford Carson, of the pioneer-stock Pavilion Carsons of the famous Diamond S.  Faced with a disappeared revenue stream for their paper and George without a seat in the House - it was time to leave town, and the Murrays, always indefatigable, knew where they wanted to go, and off they went.

North to the Alaska Highway
Both she and George were vocal proponents of the Alaska Highway and excitedly moved to the instant city of Fort St. John to chronicle its birth at the launching of construction on the mammoth project and launched their Alaska Highway News upon arrival.  The account of this experience in The Newspapering Murrays vividly documents the wild times and of that instant boomtown at its birth, and exposes much of the material waste that went into the U.S. military's building of the highway.  The Alaska Highway News was just as spicy as its Lillooet counterpart, and it is from that paper that a much-syndicated (even to The New York Times) advice about "not flushing for no. 1, but save the flushing for no. 2" comes from. She was one of the locals interviewed in the National Film Board of Canada short "People of the Peace" (1958).

Ma's character
Despite her country background and being uneducated—-though widely read—-Ma had astute business and management sense, if not exactly political acuity, and her penny-trimming skills dragged both company and family (and husband) through bad times.  Her sharp tongue was legendary but her office was known for having an open door to any who dropped by, and she was a relentless self-promoter and Lillooet-booster and a devoted newspaperwoman to the bitter end.  She was also not likely to back down from a verbal fight.

George in and out of Parliament
In 1949 George ran successfully for Member of Parliament for the Cariboo riding, which included Lillooet, but lost in 1953 when the candidate for the rising forces of Social Credit in B.C. edged out Murray, in part thanks to the third-party split from the CCF candidate.  Complicating the race was that Ma had decided to run for the legislature (in the same election, but for a different party - Social Credit, no less, and without telling him first, then switching to a fringe party, the "Common Herd" or People Party, in the riding of North Peace River).  She's already had a high-profile political career as an editorialist, and was often a social embarrassment to her husband (who still loved her deeply nonetheless).  Ma withdrew from the race, but the damage was done.  George was shamed out of politics and, by now an outsider in revolt from the Liberal-Conservative Coalition and unwilling to join league with Bennett's Socreds, he gave up on his political career and retired from the House of Commons, returning to being publisher and grandfather only.

George died in 1961, but Ma survived him by 21 years, and continued to run and publish the paper after his death -- and to raise eyebrows with her editorials, and laughter with her speeches and frank opinions.  Ma but spent her last days back at the editors' desk in historic Lillooet, British Columbia, churning out her raunchy wit and lusty language until the very last, continuing to write a column now and then even after her retirement as editor.

Ma Murray died in 1982. She was survived by her daughter, Georgina.  A son, Dan, died of cancer in 1981.  Both children were working journalists, literally being fed the business with each meal while they were growing up, given the famously heated flavour of their parents' debates.  Dan and Georgina's offspring continue with the Murray's journalistic tradition.

House in Anmore
In 1988 the village of Anmore, British Columbia donated George and "Ma" Murray's former home at the corner of Sunnyside and East Road, by the current owners, saving the historical structure from the wrecking ball. The printing presses used to print The Chinook  remain in the converted garage.

Elementary school
Named in her honor, the Margaret 'Ma' Murray Community School, grades k-6, was opened in Fort St. John in 2018.

References

Sources
Literary and Archives Canada Website Ma Murray Profile
North Peace Digital Community website biography
Ma Murray Community Newspaper Awards
Lillooet History Website
Bridge River-Lillooet Online Archive (historic and scenic images and commentaries)

Further reading
"The Rebel Queen of the Northwest.", Earle Beattie, Chatelaine Vol. 25, no. 5 (May 1952), P. 16–17, 78+.
"Ma Murray: The Salty Scourge of Lillooet.", Jackson House,  Maclean's Vol. 79 (March 19, 1966), P. 18, 48, 50.
  Keddell, Georgina. -- The Newspapering Murrays, 2016 eBook version of the 1974 edition by Lillooet Publishers.  Free iBook version available from iTunes here
  Keddell, Georgina. -- The Newspapering Murrays—Halifax, N.S.: Goodread Biographies, 1984. -- 302 p.
"Ma Murray's Bridge River-Lillooet News.", in A History of Weekly Newspapers of British Columbia, Mission City? B.C.: British Columbia Weekly Newspapers Association, 1972. P. 60–61.
"Margaret "Ma" Murray: Spearing for the Truth.", Grant MacEwan, in Mighty Women: Stories of Western Canadian Pioneers, Vancouver: Greystone Books, 1995. -- P. 253-260
"The Strength of the Weeklies", J. Louis McKenna, Atlantic Advocate, Vol. 56, no. 12 (August 1966). P. 18-23
"Murray, Margaret Teresa.", Jean O'Clery, Canadian Encyclopedia, Edmonton: Hurtig Publishers, 1988. Vol. 3, p. 1407.
"Ma Murray : the story of Canada's crusty queen of publishing.", Stan Sauerwein, Canmore, AB : Altitude Pub. Canada, c 2003. -- 135p.

Canadian women journalists
Officers of the Order of Canada
American emigrants to Canada
People from Kansas
1888 births
1982 deaths
Journalists from British Columbia
Lillooet Country
Spouses of Canadian politicians
Canadian people of Irish descent
American people of Irish descent
Canadian newspaper founders
People from Lillooet
American women company founders
Writers from Vancouver
20th-century Canadian women writers
Canadian women non-fiction writers
Canadian women company founders
20th-century American women